Ajmonia is a genus of cribellate araneomorph spiders in the family Dictynidae, and was first described by Lodovico di Caporiacco in 1934.

Species
 it contains twelve species restricted to Asia and parts of Algeria:
Ajmonia aurita Song & Lu, 1985 – Kazakhstan, China
Ajmonia bedeshai (Tikader, 1966) – India (mainland, Andaman Is.)
Ajmonia capucina (Schenkel, 1936) – China
Ajmonia lehtineni Marusik & Koponen, 1998 – Mongolia
Ajmonia marakata (Sherriffs, 1927) – India
Ajmonia numidica (Denis, 1937) – Algeria
Ajmonia patellaris (Simon, 1911) – Algeria
Ajmonia procera (Kulczyński, 1901) – China
Ajmonia psittacea (Schenkel, 1936) – China
Ajmonia rajaeii Zamani & Marusik, 2017 – Iran
Ajmonia smaragdula (Simon, 1905) – Sri Lanka
Ajmonia velifera (Simon, 1906) (type) – India to China

References

Araneomorphae genera
Dictynidae
Spiders of Africa
Spiders of Asia